The Kiya is a river in Tomsk and Kemerovo Oblasts of Russia. The river has its sources in the Kuznetsk Alatau and flows in a northwesterly direction to its mouth in the Chulym some  upriver from the town of Asino.

Its main tributaries are from the right: Tyazhin and Chet, and from the left: Kozhakh and Antibes.

The town of Mariinsk lies along the Kiya.

References

Rivers of Kemerovo Oblast
Rivers of Tomsk Oblast